Andrei Alekseyevich Arlashin (born 21 February 1990) is a Russian former professional footballer.

Club career
He made his Russian Football National League debut for FC Petrotrest St. Petersburg on 9 July 2012 in a game against FC Ural Yekaterinburg.

Personal life
He is a twin brother of Denis Arlashin.

External links
 
 Career summary at sportbox.ru

1990 births
Living people
Russian footballers
Association football midfielders
Russian twins
Twin sportspeople
FC Petrotrest players
FC Daugava players
FC Spartak Kostroma players
Latvian Higher League players
Russian expatriate footballers
Expatriate footballers in Latvia
Russian expatriate sportspeople in Latvia